Any Day Now (also known as The Oasis of Now) is a 2020 Finnish drama film written and directed by . The film tells story about an Iranian immigrant's family living in Finland and the family's constant fear of obtaining a negative residence permit. The film features Shahab Hosseini and Laura Birn, among others.

Premise
The Iranian Mehdipours have been living in a refugee center in Finland for a while now. As the 13-year-old Ramin is enjoying his school holidays, the family receives a negative decision on their asylum application. After filing the last possible appeal, the Mehdipours try to continue with their everyday lives and keep a positive attitude despite the looming danger of deportation. Ramin starts the new school year in which every moment will be more precious than ever.

Cast

Production
The film's Mehdipour family is based on the director Hamy Ramezan's own experiences 30 years ago, when his own family came to Finland to escape the war between Iran and Iraq. The 2015 refugee flow to Europe and the ensuing public debate haunted Ramezan, and in those mental landscapes the young director set about preparing his first feature film. The first versions of the manuscript were full of nightmares and dark compared to what ended up in the final version.

Awards and Nominees

References

External links
 
 

2020 films
2020 drama films
Drama films based on actual events
2020s English-language films
Finnish drama films
2020s Finnish-language films
Films about immigration to Europe
Films set in Finland
Films shot in Finland
Persian-language films
Iranian emigrants to Finland
Refugees in Finland
2020 multilingual films
Finnish multilingual films